George Frederick Pelham (1867 – February 7, 1937) was an American architect and the son of George Brown Pelham, who was also an architect.

Life and career
Pelham was born in Ottawa, Ontario, coming to New York City when his father opened an architectural office there in 1875.  The elder Pelham designed for the city's Department of Public Parks, and employed his son as a draftsman in his firm.  After being privately tutored in architecture, the younger Pelham opened his own office in 1890, specializing in apartment houses and hotels, row houses, and commercial buildings and utilizing the Renaissance Revival, Gothic Revival and Colonial Revival styles.  His work is particularly represented on the Upper West Side of Manhattan.  He designed buildings for 43 years;  his final building was the Central Hanover Bank and Trust Company Building.

Pelham was the architect of the Chalfonte Hotel at 200 West 70th Street in Manhattan.  Built in 1927, it was later converted to rental apartments and is still standing today.

In 1905, he designed the Riverdale apartment building at 67 Riverside Drive for developer John Louis Miller. It opened on October 31, 1907. In 1905 he also designed a new synagogue building for Brooklyn's Beth Jacob Anshe Sholom, based on Arnold Brunner's West Side Synagogue building on Manhattan's West 88th Street. The synagogue is no longer extant.

For many years the office was at 200 West 72nd Street, originally built as a clubhouse for the Colonial Club of New-York. Pelham, like Rosario Candela, chose that address because a number of developers had their offices there, including Paterno & Son and Anthony Campagna.

Pelham's son George Fred Pelham Jr. joined the firm in 1910 and continued the family tradition; he was the architect of a number of New York City buildings, such as Castle Village in 1938-1939, 411 West End Avenue in 1937, and 1150 Park Avenue in 1940.

Works

Sources (unless otherwise noted):"George F. Pelham" on Phorio.com (addresses of named buildings)

References
Notes

Bibliography
Harris, Gale and Shockley, Jay. East 17th Street / Irving Place Historic District Designation Report New York City Landmarks Preservation Commission (June 30, 1998)

Pearson, Marjorie. Ladies' Mile Historic District Designation Report, volume 2 New York City Landmarks Preservation Commission (May 2, 1989)
Pearson, Marjorie. Tribeca West Historic District Designation Report  New York City Landmarks Preservation Commission (May 7, 1991)
Presa, Donald G. NYCLPC SoHo - Cast-Iron Historic District Extension Designation Report New York City Landmarks Preservation Commission (May 11, 2010)
Wade, Karen Graham; Pearson, Marjorie and Dillon, James T. SoHo - Cast Iron Historic District Designation Report New York City Landmarks Preservation Commission (August 14, 1973)

External links

1857 births
1937 deaths
Architects from New York City
19th-century American architects